Matthew Bohrer is an American actor and writer best known for roles in the television shows Lucifer, Goliath, and Masters of Sex.

Early life 

While growing up in San Diego, Matthew Bohrer performed in multiple plays with the Playwrights Project at the Tony Award-Winning Old Globe Theatre.

Bohrer graduated from Harvard University with a B.A. in English and a minor in Dramatic Arts. While at Harvard, he was a member of the Hasty Pudding Theatricals and the Signet Society of Arts and Letters, and sang with the Krokodiloes, Harvard's oldest a cappella group.

Career 

After college, Bohrer began his acting career on stage, appearing as “Eddie” in Center Theatre Group's production of The Sunshine Boys at the Ahmanson Theater, opposite Danny DeVito and Judd Hirsch. He returned to Center Theatre Group in the world premiere of Marjorie Prime at the Mark Taper Forum.

On screen, Bohrer's notable roles include AUSA Ira Fuchstein opposite Billy Bob Thornton in David E. Kelley's Amazon series Goliath. He also played aspiring sex therapist Roger Fleming opposite Lizzy Caplan and Betty Gilpin on the award-winning Showtime drama, Masters of Sex.

Bohrer's other television credits include Lucifer, Grown-ish, Modern Family, Grey's Anatomy, Scandal, House of Lies, and I Didn't Do It, and has played hot-shot attorney "Henry Sullivan" on General Hospital since 2014. He made his feature film debut in the Universal release, Unfriended. He also starred as renowned physicist Richard Feynman in the film, D'Arline, which received a Sloan Foundation award, and played the title role of a Romanian Holocaust survivor in the award-winning film, Elie's Overcoat.

Bohrer has also maintained a presence in the Los Angeles theater scene, winning plaudits for roles such as "Josh" in the Rockwell musical production of Clueless, "Petty" in Disasteroid at Sacred Fools Theater, and "Romeo" in Romeo and Juliet.

Filmography 
Selected filmography

References

External links 
 Official Website
 
 Matthew Bohrer on BroadwayWorld

Harvard College alumni
Year of birth missing (living people)
Living people
American male television actors
21st-century American male actors